William Hannah Miller (1895 – 1970) was a Scottish footballer who played as a centre half for Hibernian.

Career
Born in Glasgow, Miller joined Hibernian from Junior team Cambuslang Rangers, where he likely took an active role in the club's consecutive Glasgow Junior Football League wins in the 1914–15 and 1915–16 seasons before moving up to senior level. In that World War I period he was also serving in the British military as a Private.

He went on to make 301 appearances with Hibernian, his only professional club, in the Scottish Football League and Scottish Cup over the next 11 years; initially he played at inside left, and scored most of his 32 goals in that role during his first two seasons at Easter Road before moving back to the 'pivot' position. Miller played in the Scottish Cup finals of 1923 (in which his team were beaten by Celtic) and 1924 (defeated by Airdrieonians). In 1928, he was released on a free transfer.

Personal life
He is one of four men named Willie Miller to play for the club, all over different eras and unrelated to one another. His father George Miller was a director at Partick Thistle for several years.

References

1895 births
Date of birth uncertain
1970 deaths
Scottish footballers
Footballers from Glasgow
Association football central defenders
British Army personnel of World War I
Cambuslang Rangers F.C. players
Hibernian F.C. players
Scottish Junior Football Association players
Scottish Football League players